Kwame Attram (born 10 January 1989 in Ghana) is a Ghanaian professional footballer striker who plays for Mufulira Wanderers.

Career

Back in 2013, Attram joined Swazi side Pigg's Peak Black Swallows following his stint in Vietnam.

Sealing a move from Congolese side Sportive Bazano to Zanaco F.C. in 2016, Attram settled well, satisfying his goal-to-game ratio with a brace against Napsa Stars while coming off the bench. Clinching the 2016 Zambian Premier League title with Zanaco, the midfielder targets a call-up to the Ghana national football team.

In March 2018, Attram joined Dire Dawa City. In the beginning of January 2019, he joined Zambian club Lusaka Dynamos.

Personal life

In view of the fact that he plays in Zambia, the Ghanaian knows some basic Nyanja, one of the country's many autochthonous languages. Also, he is a Christian and goes to church on a regular basis.

References

External links
Kwame Attram at Footballdatabase

Association football midfielders
Zanaco F.C. players
Ghanaian footballers
Expatriate footballers in Zambia
Living people
1989 births
Expatriate footballers in Ethiopia
Expatriate footballers in Eswatini
Expatriate footballers in Thailand
Expatriate footballers in Vietnam
Expatriate footballers in Egypt
Ghanaian expatriate footballers
Dire Dawa City S.C. players